The following are the national records in speed skating in Singapore maintained by the Singapore Ice Skating Association (SISA).

Men

Women

References

External links
SISA website

National records in speed skating
Speed skating-related lists
Records
Speed skating
Speed skating